Granton Trawler was one of the only films that John Grierson directed himself for the Empire Marketing Board/GPO Film Unit. The documentary style film was made in 1934, and was noted for its experimental use of sound without voice over.

Synopsis
The film is about the "Isabella Grieg" which was a fishing trawler that traveled from Granton Harbour to through the east coast of Edinburgh, then to the fishing grounds between Shetland and Norway.

Legacy

Russian filmmaker Andrei Tarkovsky listed it as one of the 77 masterpieces of world cinema.

References

External links

    
    

1934 documentary films
1934 films
Documentary films about water transport
Films directed by John Grierson
Documentary films about fishing
British black-and-white films
Granton, Edinburgh
American documentary films
Mass media in Shetland
1930s American films